Robert Milson Appleby (28 April 1922, in Denton – 8 February 2004, in Grimsby) was a British palaeontologist.
Appleby developed the Analogue Video Reshaper which was used to compare the anatomical structure of fossilised Ichthyosaurs as well as match fingerprints in criminal investigations.

References 

1922 births
2004 deaths
British palaeontologists
People from Denton, Greater Manchester